M. Butterfly is a 1993 American romantic drama film directed by David Cronenberg. The screenplay was written by David Henry Hwang based on his play of the same name. The film stars Jeremy Irons and John Lone, with Ian Richardson, Barbara Sukowa, and Annabel Leventon. The story is loosely based on true events which involved French diplomat Bernard Boursicot and Chinese opera singer Shi Pei Pu.

Synopsis
René Gallimard (Jeremy Irons) is a French diplomat assigned to Beijing, China in the 1960s. He becomes infatuated with a Peking opera performer, Song Liling (John Lone), who spies on him for the Government of the People's Republic of China. Their affair lasts for 20 years and they subsequently marry, with Gallimard all the while apparently unaware, or willfully ignorant, of the fact that in Peking opera, Dan roles are traditionally performed by men.

Cast
 Jeremy Irons as René Gallimard
 John Lone as Song Liling
 Ian Richardson as Ambassador Toulon
 Barbara Sukowa as Jeanne Gallimard
 Annabel Leventon as Frau Baden
 Shizuko Hoshi as Comrade Chin
 Vernon Dobtcheff as Agent Entacelin

Differences with real life events 
At the end of the film Gallimard kills himself. Nevertheless, the man the character is based on, Bernard Boursicot, did not succeed in doing so in real life.

Themes 
One theme of the film (as well as with the play it's based on) is Orientalist stereotypes, but Cronenberg removed many of the political overtones from the story, in order to focus more intensely on the relationship between Gallimard and Song. A key line in the film is "Only a man knows how a woman is supposed to act".

Reception
M. Butterfly grossed  $1,500,000 in the domestic box office.

On review aggregator website Rotten Tomatoes, the film holds an approval rating of 43%, based on 21 reviews, and an average rating of 5.60/10. The website's critics consensus reads: "David Cronenberg reins in his provocative sensibility and handles delicate material with restraint, yielding a disappointing adaptation that flattens M. Butterfly into a tedious soap opera." On Metacritic, the film has a weighted average score of 43 out of 100, based on 19 critics, indicating "mixed or average reviews".

See also

 M. Butterfly
 Cross-dressing in film and television

References

External links
 
 
 
 
 

1993 films
1993 romantic drama films
1993 LGBT-related films
1990s spy drama films
American romantic drama films
American spy drama films
1990s English-language films
Films directed by David Cronenberg
Cross-dressing in American films
Spy films based on actual events
Romance films based on actual events
Drama films based on actual events
American films based on plays
Films set in Beijing
Films set in the 1960s
Films about interracial romance
Cold War spy films
The Geffen Film Company films
Warner Bros. films
Films scored by Howard Shore
Transgender-related films
LGBT-related romantic drama films
1990s American films